Jazz at Lincoln Center is part of Lincoln Center in New York City. The organization was founded in 1987 and opened at Time Warner Center in October 2004. Wynton Marsalis is the artistic director and the leader of the Jazz at Lincoln Center Orchestra.

The center hosts performances by the orchestra and by visiting musicians. Many concerts are streamed live on the center's YouTube channel. The center also presents educational programs in its home buildings, online, and in schools throughout the country.

History

In 1987, trumpeter Wynton Marsalis was involved in starting the Classical Jazz concert series, the first series of jazz concerts at Lincoln Center.

In 1996, the Jazz at Lincoln Center organization became a constituent of Lincoln Center next to organizations such as the New York Philharmonic and the Metropolitan Opera. The budget for Jazz at Lincoln Center was $4 million in 1996, compared to $150 million for the Metropolitan Opera. In 2016, its budget was over $50 million. Wynton Marsalis has been artistic director since 1987. Greg Scholl became executive director in 2012.

Marsalis leads the Jazz at Lincoln Center Orchestra, which performs in the Appel Room and the Rose Theater in addition to extensive international tours. Concerts are also broadcast live online. Educational programs are broadcast on the center's YouTube channel. Since 2015, the orchestra's albums have been issued on its own label, Blue Engine Records.

The center distributes jazz curriculums to high schools through its Essentially Ellington program. Professional musicians visit schools through the Let Freedom Swing program. The center runs a Middle School Jazz Academy, a High School Jazz Academy, and a Summer Academy, all in New York City, all of them with free tuition. Every year the orchestra tours and visits schools throughout the U.S. The Essentially Ellington High School Jazz Band Competition and Festival takes place every year at Jazz at Lincoln Center.

Rose Hall

The performing arts complex, Frederick P. Rose Hall, was designed by Rafael Viñoly and is the basement of Deutsche Bank Center (originally Time Warner Center). Rose Hall consists of three venues: Rose Theater, The Appel Room, and Dizzy's Club, named after trumpeter Dizzy Gillespie. The Hall also contains the Irene Diamond Education Center with rehearsal and recording rooms.

Hall of Fame
The Nesuhi Ertegun Jazz Hall of Fame is named for Nesuhi Ertegun, co-founder of Atlantic Records. A 60-person international voting panel, which includes musicians, scholars and educators from 17 countries, is charged to nominate and select "the most definitive artists in the history of jazz for induction into the Hall of Fame".

Inductees have included:

2004
 Louis Armstrong (1901–1971), trumpeter
 Sidney Bechet (1897–1959), saxophonist
 Bix Beiderbecke (1903–1931), cornetist
 John Coltrane (1926–1967), saxophonist
 Miles Davis (1926–1991), trumpeter
 Duke Ellington (1899–1974), pianist
 Dizzy Gillespie (1917–1993), trumpeter
 Coleman Hawkins (1904–1969), saxophonist
 Billie Holiday (1915–1959), vocalist
 Thelonious Monk (1917–1982), pianist
 Jelly Roll Morton (1890–1941), pianist
 Charlie Parker (1920–1955), saxophonist
 Art Tatum (1909–1956), pianist
 Lester Young (1909–1959), saxophonist

2005
 Count Basie (1904–1984), pianist, organist
 Roy Eldridge (1911–1989), trumpeter
 Ella Fitzgerald (1917–1996), vocalist
 Benny Goodman (1909–1986), clarinetist
 Earl Hines (1903–1983), pianist
 Johnny Hodges (1907–1970), saxophonist
 "Papa" Jo Jones (1911–1985), drummer
 Charles Mingus (1922–1979), bassist
 Joe "King" Oliver (1885–1938), cornetist
 Max Roach (1924–2007), drummer
 Sonny Rollins (1930–  ), saxophonist
 Fats Waller (1904–1943), pianist, organist

2007
 Clifford Brown (1930–1956), trumpeter
 Benny Carter (1907–2003), saxophonist, clarinetist, trumpeter
 Charlie Christian (1916–1942), guitarist
 Django Reinhardt (1910–1953), guitarist

2008
 Ornette Coleman (1930–2015), free jazz pioneer
 Gil Evans (1912–1988), jazz arranger
 Bessie Smith (1894–1937), blues singer
 Mary Lou Williams (1910–1981), pianist, arranger

2010
 Bill Evans (1929–1980), pianist, composer
 Bud Powell (1924–1966), pianist
 Billy Strayhorn (1915–1967), composer, pianist, lyricist, arranger
 Sarah Vaughan (1924–1990), vocalist

2013
 Art Blakey (1919–1990), drummer, bandleader
 Lionel Hampton (1908–2002), vibraphonist, pianist, percussionist, bandleader
 Clark Terry (1920–2015), flugelhornist, trumpeter

2014
 Betty Carter (1929–1998), vocalist
 Fletcher Henderson (1897–1952), pianist, bandleader, arranger, composer
 Elvin Jones (1927–2004), drummer
 Wes Montgomery (1923–1968), guitarist

References

External links
 
 
 

Jazz organizations
Lincoln Center
Music venues in Manhattan
Rafael Viñoly buildings
Columbus Circle
Jazz in New York City
1987 establishments in New York City